Stephen R. Maitland (born August 19, 1962) is a former Republican member of the Pennsylvania House of Representatives.

He is a 1980 graduate of Gettysburg Senior High School. He earned a degree in political science from Mount St. Mary's University in 1991. He attended M.A. classes in the Science, Technology and Public Policy program at the Elliott School of International Affairs at George Washington University. He earned his Juris Doctor degree from Widener University Commonwealth Law School in December, 2006.  After working as the development officer for the Army Heritage Center Foundation in Carlisle, Pennsylvania, he went on to practice law in a solo general practice - specializing in the criminal defense of the mentally ill offender.

He moved with his family to suburban Atlanta in September 2012, where he works as a business consultant in life sciences and data industries, and also serves as a business attorney to local businesses.

He was first elected to represent the 91st legislative district in the Pennsylvania House of Representatives in 1992. He was defeated for re-election in 2006.

References

External links
Pennsylvania House of Representatives - Stephen R. Maitland (Republican) official PA House profile (archived)
Pennsylvania House Republican Caucus - Representative Stephen Maitland official Party website (archived)

Living people
Republican Party members of the Pennsylvania House of Representatives
Mount St. Mary's University alumni
Elliott School of International Affairs alumni
1962 births